Complement component 1 Q subcomponent-binding protein, mitochondrial is a protein that in humans is encoded by the C1QBP gene.

The human complement subcomponent C1q associates with C1r and C1s in order to yield the first component of the serum complement system. The protein encoded by this gene is known to bind to the globular heads of C1q molecules and inhibit C1 activation. This protein has also been identified as the p32 subunit of pre-mRNA splicing factor SF2, as well as a hyaluronic acid-binding protein.

Protein subunit
C1QBP is 282 amino acid in length and has three homologous subunit with its N-terminal 73 amino acid residues cleaved off to produce mature C1QBP. C1QBP appears as a monomer around 33 kDa on SDS-PAGE gel under both reducing and nonreducing condition but migrates as a trimer on size-exclusion chromatography (gel filtration).

Protein structure
The crystal structure of C1QBP at 2.25 Å resolution shows a homotrimeric ring displaying symmetry. The individual subunits are held together by noncovalent interactions and forms a doughnut shaped quaternary structure with a central cavity of 20 Å in diameter. Each Subunit of C1QBP has seven β-strand (β1- β7) and three α-helices (α1- α3). C1QBP is negatively charged on its soluble face while the membrane face is predominantly positively charged.

Interactions
C1QBP has been shown to interact with Protein kinase D1, BAT2, PRKCD, PKC alpha and Protein kinase Mζ.
Other interacting partners of C1QBP include protein domains from pathogens such as bacteria, virus  and plasmodium falciparum. Plasma proteins including fibrinogen, FXII and HK have been demonstrated to interact with C1QBP in a zinc dependent manner,. Recently, a tumour homing peptide, LyP-1(CGNKRTRGC) has been shown to selectively bind to C1QBP in tumour expressing cells.

References

Further reading

External links